The women's snowboard giant slalom competition at the 2017 Asian Winter Games in Sapporo, Japan was held on 19 February at the Sapporo Teine.

Schedule
All times are Japan Standard Time (UTC+09:00)

Results
Legend
DSQ — Disqualified

References

External links
Results at FIS website

Women's giant slalom